Percy's Progress is a 1974 British comedy film directed by Ralph Thomas.  It was written by Sid Colin, Harry H. Corbett and Ian La Frenais.  It was released in the United States under the title It's Not the Size That Counts. The US version of the film includes several additional scenes shot by the American distributor, which include an opening scene of a penis transplant operation, and a scene in which a dwarf is seen jumping out of a woman's bed, leaving her to say the film's American title, "It's not the size that counts."  The dwarf in question was Luis De Jesus, the star of the infamous Blood Sucking Freaks.

Harry H. Corbett's character was closely modelled on British prime minister Harold Wilson, down to using well-known Wilson phrases such as "thirteen years of Tory misrule" and speaking with a distinct Yorkshire accent.

The film is a sequel to Percy, which was itself based on a novel of the same name by Raymond Hitchcock.

Synopsis

Percy is known in England as the man who had the world's first penis transplant, and is exceptionally well endowed. His rampant conquests of married women cause him to escape incarceration by local authorities.

A chemical is accidentally released into the world's water supply rendering all men impotent. Percy is unaware that he is the only man on earth who can achieve an erection because he was in hiding from the law at sea, drinking nothing but champagne.

When Percy goes ashore to relieve his year-long sexual tension at a brothel, he gains the attention of the British press and subsequently the British government, who then want to use him to repopulate the world. An international pageant is held to find each country's "Miss Conception" representative. At the same time, a team of doctors work to find an antidote to the effects of "P.S.- 123".

Cast
 Leigh Lawson as Percy Edward Anthony
 Elke Sommer as Clarissa
 Denholm Elliott as Sir Emmanuel Whitbread
 Judy Geeson as Dr. Fairweather
 Harry H. Corbett as Prime Minister
 Vincent Price as Stavos Mammonian
 Adrienne Posta as PC 217 (Iris)
 Julie Ege as Miss Hanson
 Barry Humphries as Dr. Anderson/Australian TV Lady
 James Booth as Jeffcot
 Milo O'Shea as Dr. Klein
 Ronald Fraser as Bleeker
 Anthony Andrews as Catchpole
 Bernard Lee as Barraclough
 Madeline Smith as Miss UK
Judy Matheson as Maria
 Alan Lake as Derry Hogan
 George Coulouris as Professor Godowski
 Jenny Hanley as Miss Teenage Lust
 Carol Hawkins as Maggie
 T. P. McKenna as News Editor
 Anthony Sharp as Judge
 Alan Tilvern as General Dodds
 Minah Bird as Miss America
 Luis De Jesus as the Dwarf (additional American footage)

Production and reception
Betty Box said they only agreed with Nat Cohen to make a sequel to Percy if he financed The Reckless Years, a film of the Byron-Shelley story. However, Cohen reneged on the deal once Percy's Progress was made.

Alexander Walker wrote in his Evening Standard column in 1974 that the film is "just about the deepest depth ever plumbed by the once considerable and now nearly contemptible British film industry in its resolute search for the lowest kind of taste among the thickest kind of people."

The film's B movie was the short crime drama Poor Billy Render starring Vicki Michelle, Garfield Morgan and Tony Selby.

References

External links

1974 films
1970s sex comedy films
British comedy films
British sex comedy films
Films shot at EMI-Elstree Studios
Films directed by Ralph Thomas
British sequel films
Films produced by Betty Box
Films with screenplays by Ian La Frenais
1974 comedy films
Films with screenplays by Sid Colin
1970s English-language films
1970s British films